Imamzadeh Sayyid Muhammad Kojajani is an Imamzadeh mosque-complex in Kojajan of Tabriz.The mosque contains the grave of Shams al-Din Sayyid Muhammad ben Sadiq ben Muhammad, descendant of the Twelver Shī‘ah Imām, Zayn al-‘Ābidīn.

Sources
Imamzadeh Sayyid Muhammad Kojajani

External links
Pictures of Imamzadeh Sayyid Muhammad Kojajani

Mosques in Tabriz